Baron  was a civil engineer, president of Kōka Daigaku, the present college of engineering of the University of Tokyo, and founding president of the Tokyo Underground Railway(東京地下鉄道), "the first underground railway in the Orient".

Biography

In 1854 he was born as a son of Furuichi Takashi a retainer of Sakai clan in Edo. In 1869, he entered Kaisei gakkō, in 1870, he was elected student on scholarship in Himeji Domain, and entered Daigaku Nankō, then studied abroad to Ecole Centrale des Arts et Manufactures in Paris as the Ministry of Education first student studying abroad. In 1879, he graduated and got the degree of BE. In the same year he entered the Faculty of Science of University of Paris, in 1889 graduated, got Bachelor of Science, and went home and took up a post as Naimushō Doboku-kyoku Yatoi. In 1881, he became the University of Tokyo lecturer and after that, he concurrently held the posts of the university teacher with the bureaucrat technical expert.

In 1886, when he was 32 years old, he was installed in Kōka Daigaku which was the forerunner of Tokyo Daigaku Kōgakubu (the University of Tokyo engineering department) first president, in 1888 was received the degree of the first Kōgaku Hakushi (Doctor of Engineering) and in 1894 was installed in the first engineering works Doboku Gikan (Vice-Minister for Engineering Affairs) in Naimushō.

He attempted to improve an engineering works public administration and established Doboku Hōki (an engineering works law). His typical services include the construction of Yokohama-ko. He helped to improve the reputation of engineering in Japan in the world as the first chairman of Nihon Kōgakkai (Japan Federation of Engineering Societies).

He would join Noritsugu Hayakawa as president of the Tokyo Underground Railway in 1920, founding the first subway system in Asia.

Legacy

The famous Japanese author Kamitake Hiraoka better known as Yukio Mishima was named after Furuichi Koi and his first name 'Kamitake' was pronounced as 'Koi' by family members. This was a gesture of honour as Koi was a benefactor of Mishima grandfather's clan - Sadataro.

References

External links
 Japan Society of Civil Engineers Bio (in Japanese)

Japanese civil engineers
1854 births
1934 deaths
University of Paris alumni
Academic staff of the University of Tokyo
Kazoku
Japanese expatriates in France
Presidents of the Japan Society of Civil Engineers